Said Mohamed Otta (born 3 January 1992) is an Egyptian professional footballer who plays as a midfielder. He joined Egyptian Premier League club Zamalek from Egyptian third division side Kaskada in summer 2011, having agreed a five-year contract.

References

1992 births
Living people
Egyptian footballers
Association football midfielders
Egyptian Premier League players
Zamalek SC players
Al Masry SC players
Al Ittihad Alexandria Club players